This is a list of the fifty golfers who have won the most official (or later deemed historically significant) money events on the PGA Tour. It is led by Sam Snead and Tiger Woods with 82 each.

Many players won important events early in the 20th century, prior to the formation of the tour, with records being kept by the PGA of America. At various times, the PGA Tour has reassessed the status of some tournaments. In the 1980s, the significance of all historical tournaments was reassessed by golf historians, working together with PGA Tour staff, during the course of a major statistical research project. The Open Championship was first recognized as an official tour event in 1995, and in 2002, all victories in earlier Open Championships were classified as official PGA Tour wins.

Accumulating 20 wins is significant, because it is one of the requirements for "life membership" on the PGA Tour. This means that the golfer does not need to requalify for membership on the tour each year by finishing in the top 125 on the money list (starting in 2013, top 125 on the FedEx Cup points list), or through an exemption for tournament victories. Many golfers struggle to do this through their late-40s, but those with 20 wins avoid this problem. However, life members are required to maintain a certain (relatively modest) standard of play to retain their playing privileges: when they can no longer do so, they are moved into the "Past champions" membership category, effectively becoming honorary members.

Since 1975, only four players have won PGA Tour events after their 50th birthday, the age at which golfers become eligible to compete on PGA Tour Champions: Craig Stadler won in 2003 at age 50, Fred Funk won in 2007 at age 50, Davis Love III won in 2015 at age 51, and Phil Mickelson won the PGA Championship in 2021 at age 50, becoming the oldest winner of a major. Sam Snead is the oldest to win a PGA event, at age 52, in 1965. Others who have won PGA Tour events past age 50 include Jim Barnes, John Barnum, and Art Wall Jr.

The list is complete .

See also
List of longest PGA Tour win streaks
Most PGA Tour wins in a year
List of golfers with most European Tour wins

Notes

References

PGA Tour
 A
PGA Tour
PGA Tour wins